The Julie Dolan Medal is awarded annually to the player voted to be the best player in the highest women's soccer league in Australia.   The medal has been presented for players in the W-League and previously the Women's National Soccer League (WNSL).  The medal is named after former Matilda's Captain and football administrator Julie Dolan. The format was changed for the 2015–16 season, with a panel featuring former players, media, referees and technical staff, who voted on each regular-season match.

Since 2016 the award has been presented jointly with the Johnny Warren Medal at an event known as the Warren - Dolan Awards , where both A-League and W-League awards are presented.

Winners

WNSL

A-League Women
The league was known as the "W-League", before being branded ahead of the 2021–22 season

Multiple winners
The following players have won the Julie Dolan Medal multiple times.

See also

 List of sports awards honoring women
 WNSL Individual honours
 W-League records and statistics
 W-League Golden Boot

References

A-League Women trophies and awards